Anatoly Nikolayevich Kirov (born 7 July 1936) is a retired Soviet heavyweight Greco-Roman wrestler. He won the Soviet title in 1956, 1958 and 1961 and a European title in 1962.

References

1936 births
Living people
Soviet male sport wrestlers
Russian male sport wrestlers